Shunyi Station is a station on Line 15 of the Beijing Subway. It is located in Shunyi District.

Station Layout 
The station has an underground island platform.

Exits 
There are 4 exits, lettered A, B, C, and D. Exit C is accessible.

Gallery

References

External links 

Beijing Subway stations in Shunyi District
Railway stations in China opened in 2011